E. H. Jones may refer to:

 E. H. Jones (author) (1883–1942), World War I author
 E. H. Jones (coach), Missouri Tigers football coach
 Elliott Jones, Vanderbilt Commodores football player and coach